Doddalahalli Kempegowda Shivakumar (born 15 May 1962), is an Indian politician  who is currently serving as the President of the Karnataka Pradesh Congress Committee (KPCC). He was the state minister of irrigation in the cabinet of H. D. Kumaraswamy. Previously he served as the Minister of Energy in the Government of Karnataka under the Siddaramaiah Government. He is an MLA from Kanakapura constituency.

Personal life
Shivakumar was born to Kempegowda and Gouramma in Kanakapura near Bangalore, Karnataka. He has a younger brother D. K. Suresh who is also a politician.Shivakumar married Usha in 1993 and has two daughters, Aishwarya and Aabharana, and a son Aakash with her. His elder daughter is married to Amartya, son of Café Coffee Day founder V. G. Siddhartha. He belongs to the Vokkaliga community and his family tradition is to pay homage to his ancestors and his late father, perform respective rituals on Ganesh Chaturthi.

Political career

Shivakumar is a 7 time MLA. He is credited with playing a critical role in the formation of the coalition government of Indian National Congress and Janata Dal (Secular) in Karnataka following the 2018 election. Earlier he had hosted Maharashtra Congress MLAs during 2001 Congress crisis. Just before his election to the Rajya Sabha in 2017 from Gujarat, he assisted his party leadership to move 42 Gujarat Congress MLAs into his resort in Bengaluru in order to avoid them moving to another political party. Subsequently, this helped Ahmed Patel to win election. He is also a close confidante of party leaders Rahul Gandhi and Sonia Gandhi.Shivakumar is among the richest politicians in India. While filing his nomination for election in 2018, he declared total assets of 840 crore.

On 2 July 2020 D. K. Shivakumar officially took charge as KPCC president succeeding Dinesh Gundu Rao.

Positions held

Electoral statistics

Controversies

On 2 August 2017, Shivakumar's residence and office in Bengaluru were raided by the Income Tax Department in connection with alleged tax irregularities. Eagleton Golf Resort in Bidadi, a town in the outskirts of Bengaluru, frequented by Shivakumar and owned by his brother D. K. Suresh, was also raided. Searches were carried out by 300 officials for a span of 80 hours in 67 locations across New Delhi, Bengaluru, Mysuru, Chennai and Shivakumar's hometown Kanakapura. It was revealed that 8 crore was seized from Shivakumar's Delhi residence and 2 crore from other locations. Central Reserve Police Force personnel were summoned to provide security during the raids. The raid followed after 44 Members of the Gujarat Legislative Assembly from the Indian National Congress were hosted in the resort after a number of legislators from the party quit to join the Bharatiya Janata Party prior to the Rajya Sabha elections. The raids ended on 5 August and reportedly an undisclosed income of nearly 300 crore was recovered. He and his associates were given anticipatory bail. On 3 September 2019, he was arrested on charges of money laundering and income tax evasion. He has called the charges "baseless" and "politically motivated" done by the BJP government of Karnataka.

Fresh ED summons have been given to him in money laundering case as more documents have been sought.

References

External links
 Official website

Karnataka MLAs 2008–2013
Karnataka MLAs 2013–2018
1962 births
Living people
Indian National Congress politicians from Karnataka
People from Ramanagara district
Karnataka MLAs 2018–2023
Indian prisoners and detainees
Prisoners and detainees of India